is a Japanese anime television series based on N.Y.SALAD written by Yoshitaka Amano. It was broadcast on NHK Educational TV in two series, the first in 2007 and the second in 2008, each with 26 episodes. Each episode is 5 minutes. It depicts lives of vegetable fairies at a kitchen in N. Y. An anime film, やさいのようせい N.Y.SALAD The Movie 3D, was released in 2010.

Characters
Brussels Sprouts
curious boy.

Garlic
naughty boy.

Eggplant
easygoing boy.

Lettuce
precocious girl.

Cherry Tomato
lively girl.

Aunt Lollo
reliable madam.

Red Pepper
trickster.

Jalapeño
brother of Red Pepper

Potato
friend of Carrot.

Carrot
friend of Potate.

Peanut
A large number brothers.

References

External links
 Official Web site
 

2007 anime television series debuts
2010 anime films
2010s Japanese-language films